In European genealogy, a descent from antiquity (DFA or DfA) is a proven unbroken line of descent between specific individuals from ancient history and people living today.  Descents can readily be traced back to the Early Middle Ages, but beyond that, insufficient documentation of the ancestry of the new royal and noble families of the period makes tracing them to historical figures from antiquity challenging.  Though the subject of ongoing effort, no well-researched, historically-documented generation-by-generation genealogical descents are known to exist in Europe.

The idea of descent from antiquity is by no means new to genealogy. Hellenistic dynasties, such as the Ptolemies, claimed ancestry from deities and mythical figures. In the Middle Ages, major royal dynasties of Europe sponsored compilations claiming their descent from Julius Caesar, Alexander the Great, and in particular the rulers of Troy (see also Euhemerism). Such claims were intended as propaganda glorifying a royal patron by trumpeting the antiquity and nobility of his ancestry. These lines of descent included not only mythical figures but also outright invention, much of which is still widely perpetuated today. The distinguishing feature of a DFA compared to such traditional pedigrees is the intent to establish an ancestry that is historically accurate and verifiable in each generation of the descent, setting the DFA apart from the legendary descents found in medieval genealogical sources and from modern pseudogenealogical descents appearing in books like The Holy Blood and the Holy Grail and The Da Vinci Code.  DFA research has focused on the ancestries of royal and noble families, since the historical record is most complete for such families.  Particular attention has focused on possible genealogical links between the new dynasties of western Europe from which well-documented descents are known, such as the Carolingians, Robertians, Cerdicings, and the Astur-Leonese dynasty, through the ruling families of the post-Roman Germanic dynasties and Franco-Romans to the gentility of the Roman Empire, or in the Eastern Mediterranean linking the royal Armenian wives of some Byzantine emperors through the ruling families of the Caucasus to the rulers of the Hellenistic, Parthian, and Roman-client kingdoms of the Middle East.

The phrase descent from antiquity was used by Tobias Smollett in the 18th-century newspaper The Critical Review. Reviewing William Betham's Genealogical Tables of the Sovereigns of the World, from the earliest to the present period, he wrote "From a barren list of names we learn who were the fathers or mothers, or more distant progenitors, of the select few, who are able to trace what is called their descent from antiquity." The possibility of establishing a DFA as a result of serious genealogical research was raised in a pair of influential essays, by Iain Moncreiffe and Anthony Wagner. Wagner explored the reasons why it was difficult to do and suggested several possible routes. The following years have seen a number of studies of possible routes through which an appropriately documented descent might be found. These routes typically involve either linkages among the ruling dynasties of the post-Roman Empire Germanic states, or those between the ancient dynasties of the Caucasus and the rulers of the Byzantine Empire.  Though largely based on historical documentation, these proposed routes have invariably resorted to speculation based on known political relationships and onomastics - the tendency of families to name children in honor of relatives is used as evidence for hypothesized relationships between people bearing the same name.  Proposed DFAs vary greatly both in the quality of their research and the degree to which speculation plays a role in their proposed connections.

No European DFA is accepted as established. The outlines of several possible ancestries that could become DFAs have been proposed, but they each lack crucial evidence. Nonetheless, the pursuit of DFAs has stimulated detailed inquiry into the prosopography of ancient and early medieval societies.

See also
Descent from Genghis Khan
Family tree of Confucius in the main line of descent

Notes

References

I. Moncreiffe of that Ilk & D. Pottinger, Blood Royal, (Nelson, London, 1956).
T. S. M. Mommaerts-Browne, 'A Key to Descents from Antiquity', Journal of Ancient and Medieval Studies III, (1984–85) 76–107
Walter Pohl, in Walter Pohl, et al., eds., "Genealogy: A Comparative Perspective from the Early Medieval West", in Meanings of Community across Medieval Eurasia: Comparative Approaches, Brill, 2016, 
N. L. Taylor, "Roman Genealogical Continuity and the 'Descents from Antiquity' Question: A Review Article", The American Genealogist, 76 (2001) 129–136.  Also available at Roman Genealogical Continuity
A. R. Wagner, "Bridges to Antiquity" in Pedigree and Progress: Essays in the Genealogical Interpretation of History (Phillimore, London, 1975)

External links

 
Genealogy
Antiquity